Aleksandr Yakovlevich Chistyakov (born 4 June 1988) is a former Russian professional football player.

Club career
He played two seasons in the Russian Football National League for FC SKA-Energiya Khabarovsk.

External links
 
 

1988 births
Sportspeople from Khabarovsk
Living people
Russian footballers
Association football forwards
Association football midfielders
FC SKA-Khabarovsk players
FC Smena Komsomolsk-na-Amure players